Hamer is an unincorporated community in Williams County, in the U.S. state of Ohio.

History
The community likely bears the name of Thomas L. Hamer, a United States Democratic congressman and soldier in the Mexican–American War. With the construction of the railroad, business activity shifted to nearby Alvordton, and the town's population dwindled.

References

Unincorporated communities in Williams County, Ohio
Unincorporated communities in Ohio